Waltz of the Toreadors (also known as The Amorous General) is a 1962 film directed by John Guillermin and starring Peter Sellers and Dany Robin. It was based on the play of the same name by Jean Anouilh with the location changed from France to England. It was nominated for a BAFTA Award for Best British Screenplay, in 1963.

The film had its World Premiere on 12 April 1962 at the Odeon Leicester Square in London's West End.

Guillermin later said "it was about the irony of old age and had a light touch".

Plot
This is the end of a glorious military career: General Leo Fitzjohn retires to his Sussex manor where he will write his memoirs. Unfortunately, his private life is a disaster: a confirmed womanizer, Leo has infuriated his wife Emily, now a shrewish and hypochondriac woman, all the more bitter as she still loves him. The General has two plain-looking daughters he dislikes and an attractive French mistress, Ghislaine, with whom he has had a platonic affair for seventeen years. When Ghislaine resurfaces, determined to complete her love with him and to get rid of Emily, Leo is at a loss what to do...

Cast

Production
The play had been a success on the London stage in 1957 in a production featuring Ralph Richardson and Margaret Leighton. Julian Wintle and Leslie Parkyn acquired the screen rights for their company, Independent Artists.

In February 1961 it was announced Peter Sellers would star in an adaptation of the play from a script by Wolf Mankowitz. Sellers was much in demand at the time, having completed Lolita and Topaze. John Guillermin, who eventually directed, had made Never Let Go with Sellers for Independent Artists. The director says Mankowitz wrote the script in two weeks.

Maria Schell was to be Sellers' co star. She was replaced by Dany Robin.

The film was presold to America's Continental Releasing, which was unusual for British independent movies.

Filming took place at Pinewood Studios in September 1961. Guillermin later claimed "the film was fucked up by the producers. They wanted to make a slapstick comedy." He says he was "thrown off the editing of the film" and in particular claims the producers ruined a ten minute scene of Sellers and Leighton which was taken directly from the play, and was filmed in one long take; Guillermin says this was intercut with a scene of Dany Robin and John Fraser. "It totally took the heart out of the film."

Reception

Box Office
The film was the 11th most popular movie at the British box office in 1962.

According to Kine Weekly the most popular movies at the British box office were The Guns of Navarone, The Young Ones, Only Two Can Play, The Comancheros, Dr. No, A Kind of Loving, Sergeants Three, Blue Hawaii, The Road to Hong Kong, That Touch of Mink, Waltz of the Toreadors and Carry On Cruising.

Critical
In The New York Times, Bosley Crowther wrote, "Mr. Sellers, still in his thirties, plays the comically stiff and paunchy role of a retired British Army general with a still-eager eye for the girls, and he does it with detail so deft and devilish that he adds another jewel to his crown."

Filmink said "I don't think comedy was Guillermin's strong suit".

References

Notes

External links

Waltz of the Toreadors at BFI
Waltz of the Toreadors at TCMDB

1962 films
Films directed by John Guillermin
British films based on plays
British comedy films
Films based on works by Jean Anouilh
Films set in Sussex
Films shot at Pinewood Studios
Films scored by Richard Addinsell
Films with screenplays by Wolf Mankowitz
1960s English-language films
1960s British films